The New Democratic Party (NDP) is a moderate conservative political party in Saint Vincent and the Grenadines. The party is led by Godwin Friday,
 and is currently the official opposition in the House of Assembly.

History
The New Democratic Party was founded in Kingstown, St. Vincent & the Grenadines on 3 December 1975. The then leader was James Fitz-Allen Mitchell commonly referred to by his peers as "Son Mitchell".
 
Mitchell took charge of the launching ceremony of the party.
 
In 1979 the New Democratic Party contested the general elections, the same year that La Soufriere Volcano had its last major eruption. The public awarded the NDP with two seats in our then 13 seat parliament.
 
Five years later the NDP romped home with nine (9) of the thirteen (13) seats, making Mitchell this country’s second Prime Minister. By way of a by–election, when then Labour Party leader Hon. Robert Milton Cato closed the last chapter of his political book; the NDP gained an additional seat advantage.
 
So far, the NDP has been the first and only political party in St. Vincent & the Grenadines to have won all the seats in national elections.
 
The development of the banana and tourism industries have been among the major pillars of economic development for St. Vincent & the Grenadines, spearheaded by the New Democratic Party.
 
When Sir James Mitchell departed elective politics, the Hon. Arnhim Ulric Eustace was elected President of the NDP and took over as this country’s third Prime Minister. He has served as Leader of the Parliamentary Opposition since 2001.
 
Under Eustace’s leadership the NDP has grown and become more democratic with the Central Executive and party delegates more involved in the election and selection of the Executive Members of the party.

In 2016 the NDP leader Arnhim Eustace resigned and from 2016 present Godwin Friday is the new leader of the party.

Electoral history

House of Assembly elections

References 

Political parties established in 1975
Political parties in Saint Vincent and the Grenadines
International Democrat Union member parties
Conservative parties
Monarchist parties